Michel Flamme is a French chef. He worked in "Byerly Turk Restaurant ", the restaurant of the Michelin starred Kildare Hotel and Golf Club (K Club) in Straffan, County Kildare, when it earned its stars between 1993 and 1994. He was executive head chef of the K Club until at least 2000.

Flamme's first Irish job was in restaurant Mirabeau in 1984. Later he moved on to the K Club.

In 2006, Flamme moved to the high-profile restaurant No. 10 in Dublin. Despite his cooking, this project ended in bankruptcy. In 2008, he worked in Solis Lough Eske in Donegal.

Awards
 Michelin star 1993-1994

References 

Irish chefs
French chefs
Living people
Head chefs of Michelin starred restaurants
Year of birth missing (living people)